Oleksandr Kozakevych (born 9 August 1975) is a retired Ukrainian football striker.

References

1975 births
Living people
Ukrainian footballers
FC Chornomorets Odesa players
SC Odesa players
FC Polissya Zhytomyr players
FC Oleksandriya players
FC Zirka Kropyvnytskyi players
FC Nyva Vinnytsia players
FC Dnister Ovidiopol players
Association football forwards